Wachsmuth is a German surname. Notable people with the surname include:

Charles Wachsmuth (1829–1896), American paleontologist
Curt Wachsmuth (1837-1905), German historian and classical philologist
Ipke Wachsmuth (born 1950), German computer scientist
Toni Wachsmuth (born 1986), German footballer

German-language surnames